The Bhutan participated at the 16th Asian Games in Guangzhou, China.

Boxing

Men

Taekwondo

Men

Women

Nations at the 2010 Asian Games
2010
Asian Games